Regina Margherita was the lead ship of her class of pre-dreadnought battleships built for the Italian Regia Marina between 1898 and 1904. She had one sister ship, Benedetto Brin. Regina Margherita saw action in the Italo-Turkish War of 1911–1912. By the outbreak of World War I in 1914, the battleship had been reduced to a training ship. She struck two naval mines on the night of 11–12 December 1916 while steaming off Valona. She sank with heavy loss of life: 675 men were killed, and only 270 survived.

Design

The ship had a flush deck and an inverted bow with a ram below the waterline. Regina Margherita had a crew of 812 officers and enlisted men.

Her propulsion system consisted of two triple expansion steam engines that drove a pair of screw propellers. Steam for the engines was provided by twenty-eight coal-fired Niclausse boilers, which were vented into three funnels, two of which were placed side by side.

As built, the ship was armed with a main battery of four  40-caliber guns placed in two twin gun turrets, one forward and one aft. The ship was also equipped with a secondary battery of four  40-cal. guns in casemates in the superstructure, and twelve  40-cal. guns, also in casemates in the side of the hull. Close-range defense against torpedo boats was provided by a battery of twenty  40-cal. guns. The ship also carried a pair of  guns, two  guns, and two  Maxim guns. Regina Margherita was also equipped with four  torpedo tubes placed in the hull below the waterline.

Regina Margherita was protected with Harvey steel manufactured in Terni. The conning tower and the casemate guns were also protected by 152 mm of armor plating. The main battery guns had stronger armor protection, at 203 mm thick.

Service

Regina Margherita laid down at the La Spezia shipyard on 20 November 1898. She was launched on 30 May 1901 in the presence of King Victor Emmanuel, and completed three years later; she was commissioned into the Italian fleet on 14 April 1904. Work progressed slowly on the ship in large part due to non-delivery of material, particularly the heavy armor. In July, the ship conducted her speed trials in the Gulf of Genoa.

Following her completion, she was assigned to the Mediterranean Squadron. The ships in the squadron were typically only on active duty for seven months of the year for training; the rest of the year they were placed in reserve. In 1907, the Mediterranean Squadron consisted of Regina Margherita, her sister , and three of the s. The ships participated in the annual maneuvers in late September and early October as the flagship of Vice Admiral Alfonso di Brocchetti.

Italo-Turkish War
On 29 September 1911, Italy declared war on the Ottoman Empire in order to seize Libya. During the Italo-Turkish War Regina Mergherita was assigned to the 1st Division of the 2nd Squadron, along with her sister and the two s. She joined the squadron on 5 October, a week after the war started. On 13 April 1912, Regina Margherita and the rest of the Squadron sailed from Tobruk to the Aegean Sea to rendezvous with the 1st Squadron. The two squadrons met off Stampalia on 17 April. The next day, the fleet steamed into the northern Aegean and cut several Turkish submarine cables.

Most of the ships of the Italian fleet then bombarded the fortresses protecting the Dardanelles in an unsuccessful attempt to lure out the Turkish fleet. While they were doing this, Regina Margherita, Benedetto Brin, and two torpedo boats were detached to cut additional cables between Rhodes and Marmaris. On 18 May, Regina Margherita bombarded Marmaris. While debarking troops on the island of Scarpanto in the Aegean, the ship's anchor chain accidentally slipped loose and killed the ship's executive officer, Captain Proli; five other men were injured in the accident. In July, Regina Margherita and the rest of the division had withdrawn to Italy to replace worn-out gun barrels, along with other repairs. In 1912, the ship had four 3-inch guns added, increasing her battery from 20 to 24 pieces.

World War I
Italy declared neutrality after the outbreak of World War I in August 1914, but by July 1915, the Triple Entente had convinced the Italians to enter the war against the Central Powers. The primary naval opponent for the duration of the war was the Austro-Hungarian Navy; the Naval Chief of Staff, Admiral Paolo Thaon di Revel, planned a distant blockade with the battle fleet, while smaller vessels, such as the MAS boats conducted raids. The heavy ships of the Italian fleet would be preserved for a potential major battle in the Austro-Hungarian fleet should emerge from its bases. By this time, Regina Margherita was long-since obsolescent, and was reduced to a training ship in the 3rd Division, along with her sister ship.

On the night of 11–12 December 1916, while sailing from the port of Valona in heavy sea conditions, she struck two mines laid by the German submarine  and blew up. There were 270 survivors and 675 men perished. The ship's loss was not announced until January 1917. Lieutenant General Oreste Bandini, the commander of the Italian Albania Expeditionary Corps, was on the ship and was among those who were killed in the sinking.

Notes

References

Further reading

External links

 Regina Margherita (1901) Marina Militare website

Regina Margherita-class battleships
World War I battleships of Italy
Ships sunk by mines
World War I shipwrecks in the Adriatic Sea
1901 ships
Ships built in La Spezia
Ships sunk by German submarines in World War I
Maritime incidents in 1916